Trolls of the Misty Mountains is a supplement published by Iron Crown Enterprises (ICE) in 1986 for the fantasy role-playing game Middle-earth Role Playing (MERP), which is itself based on the works of J.R.R. Tolkien.

Description

Background
In The Hobbit, Tolkien's precursor to The Lord of the Rings, Bilbo Baggins and his companions encounter some of the denizens that live under the Misty Mountains.

Contents
This book contains three adventures that take place in the vestiges of the former kingdom of Rhudaur that once lay against the eastern side of the Misty Mountains. The time is 1600 years after the defeat of Sauron by the Last Alliance of Elves and Men, and 1500 years before the events described in The Hobbit and The Lord of the Rings. It includes a set of three adventures of increasing difficulty. 

The adventurers are hired to reconnoitre the route of a proposed road to be built between the keeps of Daenos and Elnost, rooting out any potential dangers such as trolls and orcs. To do this, they must complete three adventures:
 "Adventure at Duildin Hill": The adventurers are hired by local farmers to stop depredations by trolls.  
 "Adventure at the Village of Garkash": The adventurers discover a goblin village quite close to the proposed road.
 "Adventure at Maes Fao": The adventurers must root out and destroy a pair of Dunedain brothers who are agents of the Witch-King of Angmar

Publication history
ICE published the licensed game Middle Earth Role-Playing in 1982, and then released many supplements for it over the next 17 years, until the Tolkien Estate withdrew their license in 1999. Trolls of the Misty Mountains was written by John Cresswell and Mike Cresswell, with a cover by Daniel Horne, cartography by Jessica Ney, and illustrations by Denis Loubet, and was published by Iron Crown Enterprises in 1986 as a 32-page book. I.C.E. revisited this area in later publications including Phantom of the Northern Marches (1986), Dark Mage of Rhudaur (1989),  and Arnor (1994).

Reception
Some reviewers were generally dismissive of this book, finding it lacked originality:
 In the December 1986 edition of Adventurer (Issue 6, Jon Sutherland was unimpressed, saying, "This is awful, boring and hack [...] The link with Tolkien’s source materials is flimsy, and the adventures are reminiscent of the old Judges Guild modules." He concluded with a recommendation to avoid this book, saying, "You would have thought that with all the rich background and the relatively high quality of the other ’ready-to-run’ modules, that the thirty -two pages would have something half decent in them. This is not the case."  
 Graham Staplehurst reviewed Trolls of the Misty Mountains for White Dwarf #87, and stated that "there is perhaps something less than original in its basis. Although useful for a GM without time to produce their own adventures, the module slips a little from the excellent standards previously set by ICE."

Denis Beck, in the April 1987 edition of Casus Belli (Issue #37), disagreed, calling theses adventures "very classic." His only complaint was "the meagreness of the historical background, which risks confusing a beginner gamemaster."

References

Middle-earth Role Playing supplements
Role-playing game supplements introduced in 1986